Golden key may refer to:

 Golden Key International Honour Society
 The English translation of the Latin phrase clavis aurea, used metaphorically in literature
 Les Clefs d'Or ("The Golden Keys"), a professional association of hotel concierges
 A song on the album Azure d'Or by Renaissance
 A 2003 single and album by Isgaard
 An encryption backdoor; see 
 Jin Suo Chi tea (lit. Golden Key)

See also
 The Golden Key (disambiguation)